The 48th Academy Awards were presented Monday, March 29, 1976, at the Dorothy Chandler Pavilion in Los Angeles, California. The ceremonies were presided over by Walter Matthau, Robert Shaw, George Segal, Goldie Hawn, and Gene Kelly. This year, ABC took over broadcast rights from NBC and has maintained the rights to this day. 

Miloš Forman's One Flew Over the Cuckoo's Nest made a "clean sweep" of the five major categories: Best Picture, Best Actor, Best Actress, Best Director and Best Screenplay (Adapted). It was the second of three films to date to do so, following It Happened One Night in 1934 and preceding The Silence of the Lambs in 1991.

20-year-old French actress Isabelle Adjani received her first nomination for Best Actress this year, becoming the youngest nominee that category, breaking the record set by 22-year-old Elizabeth Hartman in 1965. Her record would be surpassed by 13-year-old Keisha Castle-Hughes in 2004, and again in 2013 by nine-year old Quvenzhané Wallis, the current record. Adjani also co-presented the award for Best Film Editing.

At 80, George Burns became the oldest acting winner, as well as the last person born in the nineteenth century to receive an acting award. His record stood until Jessica Tandy won Best Actress in 1989; Burns was later succeeded as the oldest Best Supporting Actor winner by Christopher Plummer, who won in 2012 for Beginners at the age of 82.

Jaws won all its nominations except Best Picture, the last film to do so until Traffic. As of the 94th Academy Awards, Amarcord, nominated for Best Director, is the last film to be nominated for Academy Awards in separate years (having won the award for Best Foreign Language Film the year before).

NBC's coverage of the NCAA championship basketball game aired opposite the ceremony; during the presentation of the Best Film Editing award, the winner was jokingly announced by presenter Elliott Gould as "Indiana, 86–68", after the undefeated Indiana Hoosiers had won the NCAA title that night in Philadelphia.

Winners and nominees

Nominees were announced on February 17, 1976. Winners are listed first, highlighted in boldface and indicated with a double dagger.

Multiple nominations and awards

These films had multiple nominations:
9 nominations: One Flew Over the Cuckoo's Nest
7 nominations: Barry Lyndon
6 nominations: Dog Day Afternoon
5 nominations: Funny Lady and Nashville
4 nominations: Jaws, The Man Who Would Be King, Shampoo and The Sunshine Boys
3 nominations: The Hindenburg
2 nominations: Amarcord, Bite the Bullet, The Day of the Locust, Profumo di donna, Tommy and The Wind and the Lion

The following films received multiple awards.
5 wins: One Flew Over the Cuckoo's Nest
4 wins: Barry Lyndon
3 wins: Jaws

Academy Honorary Award
 Mary Pickford

Irving G. Thalberg Memorial Award
 Mervyn LeRoy

Jean Hersholt Humanitarian Award
 Jules C. Stein

Special Achievement Award
 Albert Whitlock and Glen Robinson for visual effect work on The Hindenburg
 Peter Berkos for sound effect work on The Hindenburg

Presenters and performers
The following individuals, listed in order of appearance, presented awards or performed musical numbers.

Presenters

Performers

See also
 33rd Golden Globe Awards
 1975 in film
 18th Grammy Awards
 27th Primetime Emmy Awards
 28th Primetime Emmy Awards
 29th British Academy Film Awards
 30th Tony Awards

References

External links
 48th Academy Awards at IMDb

Academy Awards ceremonies
1975 film awards
1976 in Los Angeles
1976 in American cinema
March 1976 events in the United States
1975 awards in the United States
Television shows directed by Marty Pasetta